Allen Township is one of the twelve townships of Ottawa County, Ohio, United States.  The 2000 census found 3,591 people in the township, 3,297 of whom lived in the unincorporated portions of the township.

Geography
Located in the northwestern corner of the county, it borders the following townships and cities:
Jerusalem Township, Lucas County - north
Benton Township - east
Clay Township - south
Lake Township, Wood County - west
Northwood - northwest, south of Oregon
Oregon - northwest, north of Northwood

The village of Clay Center is located in the southern part of the township, and the unincorporated communities of Curtice and Williston lie in the township's north.

Name and history
Statewide, other Allen Townships are located in Darke, Hancock, and Union counties.

Government
The township is governed by a three-member board of trustees, who are elected in November of odd-numbered years to a four-year term beginning on the following January 1. Two are elected in the year after the presidential election and one is elected in the year before it. There is also an elected township fiscal officer, who serves a four-year term beginning on April 1 of the year after the election, which is held in November of the year before the presidential election. Vacancies in the fiscal officership or on the board of trustees are filled by the remaining trustees.

References

External links
County website

Townships in Ottawa County, Ohio
Townships in Ohio